The 1949 Humboldt State Lumberjacks football team represented Humboldt State College during the 1949 college football season. Humboldt State competed in the Far Western Conference (FWC).

The 1949 Lumberjacks were led by first-year head coach Ted Staffler. They played home games at the Redwood Bowl in Arcata, California. Humboldt State finished with a record of zero wins, eight losses and one tie (0–8–1, 0–3–1 FWC). The Lumberjacks were outscored by their opponents 78–257 for the season.

Schedule

Notes

References

Humboldt State
Humboldt State Lumberjacks football seasons
College football winless seasons
Humboldt State Lumberjacks football